Pseudolasius is a genus of ants in the subfamily Formicinae. The genus is known from southern Asia (from India to China) to northern Australia, where it appears to be restricted to tropical areas.

Species

Pseudolasius amaurops Emery, 1922
Pseudolasius amblyops Forel, 1901
Pseudolasius australis Forel, 1915
Pseudolasius badius Viehmeyer, 1916
Pseudolasius bidenticlypeus Xu, 1997
Pseudolasius binghami Emery, 1911
†Pseudolasius boreus Wheeler, 1915
Pseudolasius breviceps Emery, 1887
Pseudolasius butteli Forel, 1913
Pseudolasius caecus Donisthorpe, 1949
Pseudolasius carinatus Karavaiev, 1929
Pseudolasius cibdelus Wu & Wang, 1992
Pseudolasius circularis Viehmeyer, 1916
Pseudolasius emeryi Forel, 1911
Pseudolasius fallax Emery, 1911
Pseudolasius familiaris (Smith, 1860)
Pseudolasius hummeli Stitz, 1934
Pseudolasius isabellae Forel, 1908
Pseudolasius jacobsoni Crawley, 1924
Pseudolasius karawajewi Donisthorpe, 1942
Pseudolasius lasioides Wheeler, 1927
Pseudolasius leopoldi Santschi, 1932
Pseudolasius liliputi Forel, 1913
Pseudolasius longiscapus Wang, W. & Zhao, 2009
Pseudolasius ludovici Forel, 1913
Pseudolasius machhediensis Bharti, Gul & Sharma, 2012
Pseudolasius martini Forel, 1911
Pseudolasius mayri Emery, 1911
Pseudolasius minor Donisthorpe, 1947
Pseudolasius minutissimus Forel, 1913
Pseudolasius minutus Emery, 1896
Pseudolasius overbecki Viehmeyer, 1914
Pseudolasius pallidus Donisthorpe, 1949
Pseudolasius pheidolinus Emery, 1887
Pseudolasius pygmaeus Forel, 1913
Pseudolasius risii Forel, 1894
Pseudolasius salvazai Santschi, 1920
Pseudolasius sauteri Forel, 1913
Pseudolasius sexdentatus Donisthorpe, 1949
Pseudolasius silvestrii Wheeler, 1927
Pseudolasius similus Zhou, 2001
Pseudolasius streesemanni Viehmeyer, 1914
Pseudolasius sumatrensis (Mayr, 1883)
Pseudolasius sunda Karavaiev, 1929
Pseudolasius tenuicornis Emery, 1897
Pseudolasius trimorphus Karavaiev, 1929
Pseudolasius typhlops Wheeler, 1935
Pseudolasius waigeuensis Donisthorpe, 1943
Pseudolasius weissi Santschi, 1910
Pseudolasius zamrood Akbar, Bharti & Wachkoo, 2017

References

External links

Formicinae
Ant genera